Zsolt Tokaji (born 25 March 1971 in Debrecen (Hungary) is a Hungarian writer, sinologist and translator chiefly known for translating many classic and early Chinese texts into Hungarian, most famously the Inner Canon of Huangdi.

Biography
Zsolt Tokaji received his MA degree from Eötvös Loránd University in 1999, (Chinese and Tibetan studies).

Translations 
Szun mester: A' hadakozás regulái (1997) 
Pu Szung-ling: A templom démona (1997) 
Wu Qi: Beszélgetések a hadviselésről (1999) 
Liu Csang: Csung Kuj, az ördögűző (1999) 
Szun Pin: A háború művészete (2003) 
Lu Jü: Teáskönyv (2005) 
Guo Pu: Temetkezések könyve (2011) 
Tai Gong hat titkos tanítása (2011) 
Zhang Qiande: Aranyhal-jegyzetek (2011) 
A Sárga Császár belső könyvei – Egyszerű kérdések (2011) 
A Sárga Császár belső könyvei – Szellemi tengely (2012) 
A Sárga Császár nyolcvanegy nehéz kérdésének könyve (2012) 
Wenzi: A titkok feltárásának igaz könyve (2013) 
Song Ci: Egy kínai halottkém feljegyzései (2013)

See also
List of Sinologists

References

External links
 Ki kicsoda 2000. Magyar és nemzetközi életrajzi lexikon, csaknem 20000 kortársunk életrajza. Hermann Péter (ed.), Biográf Kiadó–Greger Média Kft., Budapest 1999. p. 1820.
 Radek Palotka: Tokaji Zsoltról és kamaszairól a „Hová mennek a kacsák?” című regénye alapján
 Zsolt Tokaji – IMDb
 Publications by Zsolt Tokaji at vm.mtmt.hu

1971 births
Living people
Hungarian sinologists
Hungarian writers
Hungarian translators